E55 may refer to:
 European route E55
 Mercedes-Benz E55 AMG, a performance car
 M113 E55, a version of the Mercedes-Benz M113 engine
 The Nokia E55 mobile phone
 Nimzo-Indian Defense, Encyclopaedia of Chess Openings code
 Ocean Ridge Airport (FAA code E55)
 Tokushima-Nanbu Expressway, Anan-Aki Expressway and Kōchi-Tōbu Expressway, route E55 in Japan